is a town located in Yamagata Prefecture, Japan. ,  the town had an estimated population of 13,615 in 4956 households, and a population density of 65 persons per km².

Geography
Yuza is located in the extreme northwest of Yamagata Prefecture, bordering on Akita Prefecture to the north and the Japan Sea on the west. Part of the town is within the borders of the Chōkai Quasi-National Park, including a portion of Mount Chōkai itself.

Neighboring municipalities
Yamagata Prefecture
Sakata
Akita Prefecture
Yurihonjō
Nikaho

Climate
Nakayama has a Humid continental climate (Köppen climate classification Cfa) with large seasonal temperature differences, with warm to hot (and often humid) summers and cold (sometimes severely cold) winters. Precipitation is significant throughout the year, but is heaviest from August to October. The average annual temperature in Nakayama is 11.9 °C. The average annual rainfall is 1906 mm with September as the wettest month. The temperatures are highest on average in August, at around 25.1 °C, and lowest in January, at around 0.3 °C.

Demographics
Per Japanese census data, the population of Yuza peaked around the year 1950 and has been declining steadily since. It is now less than it was a century ago.

History
The area of present-day Yuza was part of ancient Dewa Province. After the start of the Meiji period, the area became part of Akumi District, Yamagata Prefecture. The village of Yuza was established on April 1, 1889 with the creation of the modern municipalities system. It was elevated to town status on April 1, 1941. On August 1, 1954, it absorbed the neighboring villages of Inagawa, Nishi-Yuza, Warabioka, Fukura, and Takase. In 2003, it joined discussions with regards to a possible merger with the neighboring city of Sakata; however, the merger discussions were closed on October 6, 2004 with Yuza electing to remain independent.

Economy
The economy of Yuza is based on agriculture and commercial fishing.

Education
Yuza has five public  elementary schools, one public middle school operated by the town government and one public high school operated by the Yamagata Prefectural Board f Education. The prefecture also operates one special education school for the handicapped.

Transportation

Railway
 East Japan Railway Company -  Uetsu Main Line
  -  -

Highway
  – Yuza Interchange

Local attractions
 Jūroku Rakan Iwa
 Chokaizan Omoimi Jinja

International relations

Twin towns — Sister cities
 Szolnok, Hungary

Notes

External links

Official Website 

Towns in Yamagata Prefecture
Yuza, Yamagata